Cytochrome P450 BM3 is a Prokaryote Cytochrome P450 enzyme originally from Bacillus megaterium catalyzes the hydroxylation of several long-chain fatty acids at the ω–1 through ω–3 positions. This bacterial enzyme belongs to CYP family CYP102, with the CYP Symbol CYP102A1.This CYP family constitutes a natural fusion between the CYP domain and an NADPH-dependent cytochrome P450 reductase.

References 

Cytochrome P450
EC 1.6.2
EC 1.14.14
Prokaryote genes